John Carre Riddell (4 June 1809 – 22 December 1879) was a politician in colonial Victoria (Australia), a member of the Victorian Legislative Council and later, the Victorian Legislative Assembly.

Riddell (pronounced Riddle) was born in Linthill, Lilliesleaf, Roxburghshire, Scotland, the third son of Thomas Riddell, of Camieston, and his wife Jane, née Ferrier.

Riddell was educated at the High School, Edinburgh, and at the University of Edinburgh. He arrived in Sydney aboard the Abberton on 20 August 1839 with his cousin Thomas Ferrier Hamilton and the pair rode to Melbourne the following month.

Riddell was a nominated member of the Victorian Legislative Council from 21 June 1852 until the original Council was abolished in March 1856. He succeeded Charles Griffith.  
Riddell was a member of the Victorian Legislative Assembly for the Electoral district of West Bourke from February 1860 until April 1877.

Riddells Creek was named after John Riddell.

References

 

1809 births
1879 deaths
Members of the Victorian Legislative Council
Members of the Victorian Legislative Assembly
Scottish emigrants to colonial Australia
Alumni of the University of Edinburgh
19th-century Australian politicians